The Roman Catholic  Archdiocese of León is an ecclesiastical territory or Metropolitan diocese of the Roman Catholic Church based in the Mexican city of León, Guanajuato. It currently covers an area of 41,940 km², and has a population of 6,500,000, including the states of Guanajuato and Querétaro.  It was created as the Diocese of León on January 26, 1863 by Pope Pius IX, and elevated to the rank of a metropolitan archdiocese by Pope Benedict XVI on November 25, 2006, with the suffragan sees of Celaya, Irapuato, and Querétaro.

The archdiocese's motherchurch and thus seat of its archbishop is the Catedral Basílica de Nuestra Señora de la Luz.

Alfonso Cortés Contreras was appointed Archbishop of León by Pope Benedict XVI on December 22, 2012, having previously served as Bishop of the Diocese of Cuernavaca. He replaced Archbishop Emeritus José Martín Rábago, whose resignation was accepted under Canon 401.1 and who had been archbishop since his appointment by Pope John Paul II in 1995. Archbishop Cortés Contreras was born in La Luz in the Roman Catholic Diocese of Zamora on July 16, 1947. He studied philosophy and theology in the Seminary of Monterrey, and subsequently earned a licentiate in theology at the Pontifical Gregorian University in Rome. He was ordained a priest on October 26, 1972. After parish ministry, he served as a professor at the Diocesan Seminary of Monterrey and of theological anthropology at the Pontifical University of Mexico. He was then called to Rome to assume the offices of Bursar and, from 1999 to 2005, Rector of the Pontifical Mexican College. During his time in Rome he was elected President of the Association of the Rectors of Ecclesiastical Colleges in Rome. On June 24, 2005, he was appointed Titular Bishop of Acque Regie and Auxiliary Bishop of Monterrey by Pope Benedict; he was ordained a bishop on August 24. On July 10, 2009, he was appointed Bishop of Cuernavaca, taking canonical possession of the diocese on August 18.

Boundaries
The Archdiocese of León is the metropolitan see of the suffragan dioceses of Irapuato, Celaya, Querétaro.

The Archdiocese of León covers the municipalities of León, Guanajuato, San Felipe, Ocampo, San Francisco del Rincón, Purísima del Rincón, Romita, Silao and Cd. Manuel Doblado.

The Diocese of Irapuato includes the municipalities of Abasolo, Cuerámaro, Huanímaro, Irapuato, Jaral del Progreso, Pénjamo, Pueblo Nuevo, Salamanca, and Valle de Santiago.

The Diocese of Celaya covers 11 municipalities: San Diego de la Unión, Dolores Hidalgo, San Luis de la Paz, San Miguel de Allende, Santa Cruz de Juventino Rosas, Comonfort, Villagrán, Celaya, Apaseo el Grande, Cortazar, and Apaseo el Alto.

The Diocese of Querétaro covers 18 municipalities of the State of Querétaro and 7 municipalities of Guanajuato: Atarjea, Docto Mora, San José Iturbide, Santa Catarina, Tierra Blanca, Victoria, and Xichú.

Bishops

List of Ordinaries of León
José de Sollano y Dávaols (1863–1881)
Tomás Barón y Morales (1882–1898)
Santiago Garza Zambrano (1898–1900), appointed Archbishop of Linares o Nueva León, Nuevo León
Leopoldo Ruiz y Flóres (1900–1907), appointed Archbishop of Linares o Nueva León, Nuevo León
José Mora y del Rio (1907–1908), appointed Archbishop of México, Federal District
Emeterio Valverde y Télles (1909–1948)
Manuel Martín del Campo Padilla (1948–1965), appointed Coadjutor Archbishop of Morelia, Michoacán
Anselmo Zarza Bernal (1966–1992)
Rafael Garcia González (1992–1994)
José Martín Rábago (1995–2012)
Alfonso Cortés Contreras (2012–present)

Coadjutor bishop
Manuel Martín del Campo Padilla (1946–1948)

Auxiliary bishop
Juan Frausto Pallares (2005–2016)

Other priests of this diocese who became bishops
Andrés Segura y Domínguez, appointed Bishop of Tepic, Nayarit in 1906
Miguel Darío Miranda y Gómez, appointed Bishop of Tulancingo, Hidalgo in 1937; future Cardinal
José Ulises Macías Salcedo, appointed Bishop of Mexicali, Baja California Norte in 1984
Gonzalo Galván Castillo, appointed Bishop of Autlán, Jalisco in 2004
José Guadalupe Torres Campos (priest here, 1984–2004), appointed auxiliary bishop of Ciudad Juárez, Chihuahua in 2005
Armando António Ortíz Aguirre, appointed Bishop of Ciudad Lázaro Cárdenas, Michoacán in 2013
Francisco González Ramos (priest here, 1982–2004), appointed Bishop of Izcalli, México in 2014

See also
List of Roman Catholic archdioceses in México

Notes

External links

Archdiocese of León website 
Catholic-Hierarchy
GCatholic.org

Roman Catholic dioceses in Mexico
Religious organizations established in 1863
Roman Catholic dioceses and prelatures established in the 19th century
Roman Catholic ecclesiastical provinces in Mexico
A
1863 establishments in Mexico